André Paro (born 7 April 1975) is a Brazilian equestrian. He competed at the 2004 Summer Olympics and the 2008 Summer Olympics.

References

External links
 

1975 births
Living people
Brazilian male equestrians
Olympic equestrians of Brazil
Equestrians at the 2004 Summer Olympics
Equestrians at the 2008 Summer Olympics
Pan American Games medalists in equestrian
Pan American Games bronze medalists for Brazil
Equestrians at the 2007 Pan American Games
Sportspeople from São Paulo (state)
Medalists at the 2007 Pan American Games
21st-century Brazilian people
20th-century Brazilian people
People from Colina, São Paulo